Photofermentation is the fermentative conversion of organic substrate to biohydrogen manifested by a diverse group of photosynthetic bacteria by a series of biochemical reactions involving three steps similar to anaerobic conversion. Photofermentation differs from dark fermentation because it only proceeds in the presence of light.

For example, photo-fermentation with Rhodobacter sphaeroides SH2C (or many other purple non-sulfur bacteria) can be employed to convert small molecular fatty acids into hydrogen and other products.

Light-dependent pathways

Phototropic bacteria 
Phototropic bacteria produce hydrogen gas via photofermentation, where the hydrogen is sourced from organic compounds.

C6H12O6 + 6H2O ->[{hv}] 6CO2 + 12H2

Photolytic producers 
Photolytic producers are similar to phototrophs, but source hydrogen from water molecules that are broken down as the organism interacts with light. Photolytic producers consist of algae and certain photosynthetic bacteria.

12H2O ->[{hv}] 12H2 + 6O2(algae)

CO + H2O ->[{hv}] H2 + CO2(photolytic bacteria)

Sustainable energy production 
Photofermentation via purple nonsulfur producing bacteria has been explored as a method for the production of biofuel. The natural fermentation product of these bacteria, hydrogen gas, can be harnessed as a natural gas energy source. Photofermentation via algae instead of bacteria is used for bioethanol production, among other liquid fuel alternatives.

Mechanism 
The bacteria and their energy source are held in a bioreactor chamber that is impermeable to air and oxygen free. The proper temperature for the bacterial species is maintained in the bioreactor. The bacteria are sustained with a carbohydrate diet consisting of simple saccharide molecules. The carbohydrates are typically sourced from agricultural or forestry waste.

Variations 

In addition to wild type forms of Rhodopseudomonas palustris, scientists have used genetically modified forms to produce hydrogen as well. Other explorations include expanding the bioreactor system to hold a combination of bacteria, algae or cyanobacteria. Ethanol production is performed by the algae Chlamydomonas reinhardtii, among other species, in cycling light and dark environments. The cycling of light and dark environments has also been explored with bacteria for hydrogen production, increasing hydrogen yield.

Advantages 
The bacteria are typically fed with broken down agricultural waste or undesired crops, such as water lettuce or sugar beet molasses. The high abundance of such waste ensures the stable food source for the bacteria and productively uses human-produced waste. In comparison with dark fermentation, photofermentation produces more hydrogen per reaction and avoids the acidic end products of dark fermentation.

Limitations 
The primary limitations of photofermentation as a sustainable energy source stem from the precise requirements of maintaining the bacteria in the bioreactor. Researchers have found it difficult to maintain a constant temperature for the bacteria within the bioreactor. Furthermore, the growth media for the bacteria must be rotated and refreshed without introducing air to the bioreactor system, complicating the already expensive bioreactor set up.

See also 
Dark fermentation
Fermentative hydrogen production
Biohydrogen
Fermentation (biochemistry)
Hydrogen production
Photochemical reaction
Photohydrogen
Phototroph
Photobiology
Electrohydrogenesis
Microbial fuel cell

References

External links 

Photo fermentation
Enhancing phototropic hydrogen production by solid-carrier assisted fermentation and internal optical-fiber illumination

Biofuels technology
Catalysis
Environmental engineering
Hydrogen biology
Hydrogen production